Herbert Rittberger (born 16 May 1949) is a former Grand Prix motorcycle road racer from Germany. His best years were in 1974, when he finished second to Henk van Kessel in the 50cc world championship, and 1976 when he again finished second in the 50cc world championship, this time to Angel Nieto. Rittberger won four Grand Prix races during his career.

References

1949 births
German motorcycle racers
50cc World Championship riders
Living people
Place of birth missing (living people)